is the first single the vocal group Bright released under a major label named Rhythm Zone. The single got weekly the #45 spot on the Oricon ranking and sold 1,630 copies in its first week.

Track listing 
CD track list
Sora Iro (ソライロ)
My Girl
Stay
ソライロ(instrumental)
My Girl(instrumental)
Stay(instrumental)

DVD track list
 Sora Iro Music Video (with dance introduction)
 Girls Party Time Live Video (Rhythm Nation 2007)
 2008.01.21 Bright Debut Premium Live: Brightest Star Live Document Clip

References

2008 singles
Bright (Japanese band) songs
2008 songs
Rhythm Zone singles
Song articles with missing songwriters